Benjamin Robbins Curtis (November 4, 1809 – September 15, 1874) was an American lawyer and judge. He served as an associate justice of the United States Supreme Court from 1851 to 1857. Curtis was the first and only Whig justice of the Supreme Court, and was also the first Supreme Court justice to have a formal law degree. He is often remembered as one of the two dissenters in Dred Scott v. Sandford (1857).

Curtis resigned from the Supreme Court in 1857 to return to private legal practice in Boston, Massachusetts. In 1868, Curtis was President Andrew Johnson's defense lawyer during Johnson's impeachment trial.

Early life and education
Curtis was born November 4, 1809, in Watertown, Massachusetts, the son of Lois Robbins and Benjamin Curtis, the captain of a merchant vessel. Young Curtis attended common school in Newton and beginning in 1825 Harvard College, where he won an essay writing contest in his junior year. At Harvard, he became a member of the Porcellian Club. He graduated in 1829, and was a member of Phi Beta Kappa. He graduated from Harvard Law School in 1832.

First private practice

Admitted to the Massachusetts bar later that year, Curtis began his legal career. In 1834, he moved to Boston and joined the law firm of Charles P. Curtis, where he developed expertise in admiralty law and also became known for his familiarity with patent law.

In 1836, Curtis participated in the Massachusetts "freedom suit" of Commonwealth v. Aves as one of the attorneys who unsuccessfully defended a slaveholding father. When New Orleans resident Mary Slater went to Boston to visit her father, Thomas Aves, she brought with her a young slave girl about six years of age, named Med. While Slater fell ill in Boston, she asked her father to take care of Med until she (Slater) recovered. The Boston Female Anti-Slavery Society and others sought a writ of habeas corpus against Aves, contending that Med became free by virtue of her mistress' having brought her voluntarily into Massachusetts. Aves responded to the writ, answering that Med was his daughter's slave, and that he was holding Med as his daughter's agent.

The Supreme Judicial Court of Massachusetts, through its Chief Justice, Lemuel Shaw, ruled that Med was free, and made her a ward of the court. The Massachusetts decision was considered revolutionary at the time. Previous decisions elsewhere had ruled that slaves voluntarily brought into a free state, and who resided there many years, became free, Commonwealth v. Aves was the first decision which held that a slave voluntarily brought into a free state became free the moment they arrived. The decision in this freedom suit proved especially controversial in slaveholding southern states. As with his fellow Massachusettsan and Harvard graduate John Adams, Curtis's willingness to serve as defense attorney for the Aves family was not necessarily reflective of his personal or legal views (cf. his dissent in the 1857 Dred Scott decision, 21 years later and 6 years into his term as an Associate Supreme Court Justice. )

Curtis became a member of the Harvard Corporation, one of the two governing boards of Harvard University, in February 1846. In 1849, he was elected to the Massachusetts House of Representatives. Appointed chairman of a committee to reform state judicial procedures, they presented the Massachusetts Practice Act of 1851. "It was considered a model of judicial reform and was approved by the legislature without amendment."

At the time, Curtis was viewed as a rival to Rufus Choate, and was thought to be the preeminent leader of the New England bar. Curtis came from a politically connected family, and had studied under Joseph Story and John Hooker Ashmun at Harvard Law School. His legal arguments were thought to be well-reasoned and persuasive. Curtis was a Whig and in tune with their politics, and Whigs were in power. As a potential young appointee, he was thought to be the seed of a long and productive judicial career. He was appointed by the president, approved by the Senate, elevated to the Supreme Court bench, but was gone in six years.

Supreme Court service

Curtis received a recess appointment to the United States Supreme Court on September 22, 1851 by President Millard Fillmore, filling the vacancy caused by the death of Levi Woodbury. Massachusetts Senator Daniel Webster persuaded Fillmore to nominate Curtis to the Supreme Court, and was his primary sponsor. Formally nominated on December 11, 1851, Curtis was confirmed by the United States Senate on December 20, 1851, and received his commission the same day. He was elected a Fellow of the American Academy of Arts and Sciences in 1854.

He was the first Supreme Court Justice to have earned a law degree from a law school. His predecessors had either "read law" (a form of apprenticeship in a practicing firm) or attended a law school without receiving a degree.

His opinion in Cooley v. Board of Wardens 53 U.S. 299 (1852) held that the Commerce Power as provided in the Commerce Clause, U.S. Const., Art. I, § 8, cl. 3, extends to laws related to pilotage. State laws related to commerce powers can be valid so long as Congress is silent on the matter. That resolved a historic controversy over federal interstate commerce powers. To this day, it is an important precedent in commerce cases. The issue was whether states can regulate aspects of commerce or whether that power is exclusive to Congress. Curtis concluded that the federal government has exclusive power to regulate commerce only when national uniformity is required. Otherwise, states may regulate commerce.

Curtis was one of the two dissenters in the Dred Scott case, in which he disagreed with essentially every holding of the court. He argued against the majority's denial of the bid for emancipation by the slave Dred Scott. Curtis stated that, because there were black citizens in both Southern and Northern states at the time of the drafting of the federal Constitution, black people thus were clearly among the "people of the United States" contemplated thereunder. Curtis also opined that because the majority had found that Scott lacked standing, the Court could not go further and rule on the merits of Scott's case.

Curtis resigned from the court on September 30, 1857, in part because he was exasperated with the fraught atmosphere in the court engendered by the case. As one source puts it, "a bitter disagreement and coercion by Roger Taney prompted Benjamin Curtis's departure from the Court in 1857." However, others view the cause of his resignation as having been both temperamental and financial. He did not like "riding the circuit," as Supreme Court Justices were then required to do. He was temperamentally estranged from the court and was not inclined to work with others.  The acrimony over the Dred Scott decision had blossomed into mutual distrust. He did not want to live on $6,500 per year, much less than his earnings in private practice.

Return to private practice
Upon his resignation, Curtis returned to his Boston law practice, becoming a "leading lawyer" in the nation. During the ensuing decade and a half, he argued several cases before the Supreme Court.  Although Curtis initially was supportive of Abraham Lincoln as president, by 1863 he was criticizing Lincoln’s “utter incompetence”, and publicly argued that the Emancipation Proclamation was unconstitutional.  This put Curtis out of the running when Lincoln had to choose a successor to Chief Justice Roger Taney who died in October 1864.  In the presidential campaign of that year, Curtis supported Democrat George B. McClellan against Lincoln.

In 1868, Curtis acted as defense counsel for President Andrew Johnson during Johnson's impeachment trial. He read the answer to the articles of impeachment, which was "largely his work". His opening statement lasted two days, and was commended for legal prescience and clarity. He successfully persuaded the Senate that an impeachment was a judicial act, not a political act, so that it required a full hearing of evidence. This precedent "influenced every subsequent impeachment".

After the impeachment trial, Curtis declined President Andrew Johnson's offer of the position of U.S. Attorney General. A highly recommended candidate for the Chief Justice position upon the death of Salmon P. Chase in 1873, Curtis was passed over by President Ulysses S. Grant. He was the unsuccessful Democratic candidate for U.S. senator from Massachusetts in 1874. From his judicial retirement in 1857 to his death in 1874, his aggregate professional income was about $650,000.

Personal life
Curtis had 12 children and was three times married.

Death and legacy
Curtis died in Newport, Rhode Island, on September 15, 1874. He is buried at Mount Auburn Cemetery, 580 Mount Auburn Street, Cambridge, Massachusetts. On October 23, 1874, Attorney General George Henry Williams presented in the Supreme Court the resolutions submitted by the bar on Curtis's death and shared observations on Judge Curtis's defense of President Andrew Johnson in the articles of impeachment against him.

Curtis's daughter, Annie Wroe Scollay Curtis, married (on December 9, 1880) future Columbia University President and New York Mayor Seth Low. They had no children.

Published works
 Reports of Cases in the Circuit Courts of the United States (2 vols., Boston, 1854)
 Judge Curtis's Edition of the Decisions of the Supreme Court of the United States, with notes and a digest (22 vols., Boston: Little Brown & Company, 1855).
 Digest of the Decisions of the Supreme Court of the United States from the origin of the court to 1854 Little Brown & Co., (1864).
  Memoir and Writings (2 vols., Boston, 1880), the first volume including a memoir by Curtis's brother, George Ticknor Curtis, and the second "Miscellaneous Writings," edited by the former Justice's son, Benjamin R. Curtis, Jr.

See also

 Demographics of the Supreme Court of the United States
 Dual federalism
 List of justices of the Supreme Court of the United States
 List of United States Supreme Court justices by time in office
 Origins of the American Civil War
 United States Supreme Court cases during the Taney Court

References

Further reading

 
 
 Flanders, Henry.  The Lives and Times of the Chief Justices of the United States Supreme Court. Philadelphia: J. B. Lippincott & Co., 1874 at Google Books.
 
 
 Huebner, Timothy S.; Renstrom, Peter; coeditor. (2003) The Taney Court, Justice Rulings and Legacy. City: ABC-Clio Inc. .
 Leach, Richard H. "Benjamin Robins Curtis, Judicial Misfit". The New England Quarterly, Vol. 25, No. 4 (Dec., 1952), pp. 507–523 (article consists of 17 pages) Published by: The New England Quarterly, Inc. 
 Leach, Richard H. Benjamin R. Curtis: Case Study of a Supreme Court Justice (Ph.D. diss., Princeton University, 1951).
 
 
 Simon, James F. (2006) Lincoln and Chief Justice Taney: Slavery, Secession, and the President's War Powers (Paperback) New York: Simon & Schuster, 336 pages. .

External links

 Fox, John, 'The First Hundred Years, Biographies of the Robes, Benjamin Robinson Curtis. Public Broadcasting Service.
 New Publications, Judge Benjamin R. Curtis, A Memoir of Benjamin Robbins Curtis, LL.D. With Some of his Professional and Miscellaneous Writings, Edited by his son, Benjamin R. Curtis, (October 19, 1879). The New York Times.

1809 births
1874 deaths
19th-century American Episcopalians
19th-century American judges
19th-century American politicians
American Unitarians
Burials at Mount Auburn Cemetery
Fellows of the American Academy of Arts and Sciences
Harvard Law School alumni
Members of the defense counsel for the impeachment trial of Andrew Johnson
Freedom suits in the United States
Massachusetts lawyers
Members of the Massachusetts House of Representatives
Massachusetts Whigs
People from Watertown, Massachusetts
United States federal judges appointed by Millard Fillmore
Recess appointments
Justices of the Supreme Court of the United States
United States federal judges admitted to the practice of law by reading law
19th-century American memoirists